The Invention of Solitude is Paul Auster's first memoir, published in the year 1982. The book is divided into two separate parts, Portrait of an Invisible Man, which concerns the sudden death of Auster's father, and The Book of Memory, in which Auster delivers his personal opinions concerning subjects such as coincidence, fate, and solitude, subjects that have become trademarks of Auster's works.

Portrait of an Invisible Man

This first part is a meditation on the nature of absence in relation to Auster's recently deceased father, Samuel Auster. "Even before his death he had been absent, and long ago the people closest to him had learned to accept this absence". Auster reconstructs his father's life from artifacts he has left behind, using his judgement of the dead man's failings as a father to justify his own life and relationship with his own son.

The Book of Memory

The second part of the book comes across as more of a critical essay concerning many of the themes found in Auster's works: the order of events, absurdism, chance as well as the overarching theme of the relationship between father and son. "For this act of saving people is in effect what a father does: he saves his little boy from harm. And for the little boy to see Pinocchio... become a figure of redemption, the very being who saves his father from the grips of death, is a sublime moment of revelation. The son saves the father." Although The Book of Memory may be seen as less autobiographical than Portrait of an Invisible Man due to the characterisation of Auster as "A.", it is his personal account of concepts and feelings and contains references to his life.

The opening pages of The Book of Memory make mention of mnemotechnics (the ancient art of memory), and some of the earliest writers on the topic - Raymond Lull, Robert Fludd and Giordano Bruno.

External links
New York Times Book Review on The Invention of Solitude 

Books by Paul Auster
1982 books